The 1903 Philadelphia Athletics season was a season in American baseball. The team finished second in the American League with a record of 75 wins and 60 losses, 14½ games behind the Boston Americans.

Offseason 
 February 1903: Ollie Pickering was purchased by the Athletics from the Cleveland Naps.

Preseason

1903 Philadelphia City Series
The A's had begun play in 1901 but National League and American League teams did not play each other in 1901 or 1902 as the leagues warred over markets and customers. 

The leagues made peace after 1902 and the Phillies and Athletics scheduled a preseason series for the local championship. The Player League’s Philadelphia Athletics and American Association Athletics had contested the local championship with the Phillies between 1883 and 1890.

Prior to the start of the series, the Athletics players threatened not to play unless they were paid a percentage of the gate receipts. Connie Mack refused his players on the grounds that while their contracts stipulated they receive gate receipts from mid-season exhibition games, the games against the Phillies would be prior to the start of the official season and unpaid exhibition games as much as any preseason contest.

The Phillies and Athletics played five of nine scheduled games; the Phillies defeated the Athletics, 4 games to 1.

The series was scheduled to begin on April 4, 1903 at the Phillies’ Philadelphia Ball Park but was called off due to rain. Games scheduled for April 7, 1903 at the Phillies’ park and April 8, 1903 at the Athletics’ Columbia Park were also canceled due to rain and wet grounds, along with the final scheduled game of the series on April 14, 1903 at the Phillies’ park.

Regular season

Season standings

Record vs. opponents

Roster

Postseason

1903 Philadelphia City Series (Fall)

The Philadelphia Phillies and Athletics played a postseason series for the local championship in addition to the preseason series played in April. The teams played seven of ten games scheduled; games scheduled for October 8, 1903; October 9, 1903; and October 10, 1903 were canceled due to rain. The Athletics won the series, 4 games to 3.

All of the series games were played at the Athletics’ Columbia Park with each team alternating as the home team. The Phillies’ Philadelphia Ball Park’s had collapsed on August 8 1903 leaving four dead, and closing the ballpark for the balance of the season.

After the 1903 season, the Phillies had won 7 and the Athletics had won 5 of the 12 total games played in the city series.

Player stats

Batting

Starters by position 
Note: Pos = Position; G = Games played; AB = At bats; H = Hits; Avg. = Batting average; HR = Home runs; RBI = Runs batted in

Other batters 
Note: G = Games played; AB = At bats; H = Hits; Avg. = Batting average; HR = Home runs; RBI = Runs batted in

Pitching

Starting pitchers 
Note: G = Games pitched; IP = Innings pitched; W = Wins; L = Losses; ERA = Earned run average; SO = Strikeouts

Other pitchers 
Note: G = Games pitched; IP = Innings pitched; W = Wins; L = Losses; ERA = Earned run average; SO = Strikeouts

Relief pitchers 
Note: G = Games pitched; W = Wins; L = Losses; SV = Saves; ERA = Earned run average; SO = Strikeouts

Notes

References 
1903 Philadelphia Athletics team page at Baseball Reference
1903 Philadelphia Athletics team page at www.baseball-almanac.com

Oakland Athletics seasons
Philadelphia Athletics season
Oakland